Arthur Gervase Carter, known as Jarvis Carter (22 December 1867 – 19 July 1933) was an English first-class cricketer active 1893–95 who played for Nottinghamshire.

References

1867 births
1933 deaths
English cricketers
Nottinghamshire cricketers